Guinea-Bissau–United States relations are bilateral relations between Guinea-Bissau and the United States.

History 

The U.S. Embassy suspended operations in Bissau on June 14, 1998, in the midst of violent conflict between forces loyal to then-President Vieira and the military-led junta. Prior to and following the embassy closure, the United States and Guinea-Bissau had enjoyed excellent bilateral relations.

The U.S. recognized the independence of Guinea-Bissau on September 10, 1974. Guinea-Bissau's Ambassador to the United States and the United Nations was one of the first the new nation sent abroad. The U.S. opened an embassy in Bissau in 1976, and the first U.S. Ambassador presented credentials later that year.

U.S. assistance began in 1975 with a $1 million grant to the UN High Commissioner for Refugees for resettlement of refugees returning to Guinea-Bissau and for 25 training grants at African technical schools for Guinean students. Emergency food was a major element in U.S. assistance to Guinea-Bissau in the first years after independence. Since 1975, the U.S. has provided more than $65 million in grant aid and other assistance.

Since the 1998 war the U.S. has provided over $800,000 for humanitarian demining to a non-governmental organization (NGO) which has removed over 2,500 mines and 11,000 unexploded ordnance from the city of Bissau; $1.6 million in food aid; and nearly $3 million for assistance for refugees, improving the cashew industry, and promoting democracy.

The United States and Guinea-Bissau signed an international military education and training (IMET) agreement in 1986, and prior to 1998, the U.S. provided English-language teaching facilities as well as communications and navigational equipment to support the navy's coastal surveillance program. The U.S. European Command's Humanitarian Assistance Program has assisted with $390,000 for constructing or repairing schools, health centers, and bridges.

The Peace Corps withdrew from Guinea-Bissau in 1998 at the start of the civil war.

In August 2004, sanctions under Section 508 of the Foreign Operations Appropriations Act—which were imposed as a result of the September 2003 military coup—were lifted and Bissau once again became eligible for IMET and other direct aid.

In March 2007, the U.S. and Brazil signed a Tripartite Memorandum of Understanding with Guinea-Bissau highlighting a parliamentary strengthening project first implemented in 2005.

Principal U.S. Officials (resident in Dakar, Senegal) include:
 Ambassador—Marcia Bernicat
 Deputy Chief of Mission--Jay T. Smith

There is no U.S. Embassy in Bissau; likewise, Guinea-Bissau does not maintain any consulate-generals in the United States (except for its Permanent mission to the United Nations in New York). The U.S. Ambassador to Senegal, who resides in Dakar, is accredited as the U.S. Ambassador to Guinea-Bissau. All official U.S. contact with Guinea-Bissau is handled by the U.S. Embassy in Dakar, Senegal. Local employees staff the U.S. Liaison Office in Bissau, and American diplomats from the embassy in Dakar travel frequently to Bissau to conduct normal diplomatic relations.

See also 
 Foreign relations of the United States
 Foreign relations of Guinea-Bissau

References

External links
 History of Guinea-Bissau - U.S. relations

 
Bilateral relations of the United States
United States